The Second Battle of Tembien was a battle fought on the northern front of the Second Italo-Ethiopian War. This battle consisted of attacks by Italian forces under Marshal Pietro Badoglio on Ethiopian forces under Ras Kassa Haile Darge and Ras Seyoum Mangasha. This battle, which resulted in a decisive defeat of Ethiopian forces, was primarily fought in the area around the Tembien Province. The battle is notable for the large-scale use of mustard gas by the Italians.

Background
On 3 October 1935, General Emilio De Bono advanced into Ethiopia from Eritrea without a declaration of War. De Bono advanced towards Addis Ababa with a force of approximately 100,000 Italian soldiers and 25,000 Eritreans. In December, after a brief period of inactivity and minor setbacks for the Italians, De Bono was replaced by Badoglio. Ethiopian Emperor Haile Selassie launched the Christmas Offensive late in the year to test Badoglio. Initially successful, the goals of this offensive were overly ambitious. 
As the progress of the Christmas Offensive slowed, Italian plans to renew the advance on the northern front got under way. In addition to being granted permission to use poison gas, Badoglio received additional ground forces. The elements of the Italian III Corps and the Italian IV Corps arrived in Eritrea during early 1936. By mid-January 1936, Badoglio was ready to renew the Italian advance. In response to his frequent exhortations, Badoglio cabled Mussolini:  "It has always been my rule to be meticulous in preparation so that I may be swift in action."

Preparation

In early January 1936 Ethiopian forces were in the hills overlooking the Italian positions and launching attacks against them on a regular basis. The Ethiopians facing the Italians were in three groups. In the center, near Abbi Addi and along the Beles River in the Tembien, were Ras Kassa with approximately 40,000 men and Ras Seyoum with about 30,000 men. On the Ethiopian right was Ras Mulugeta Yeggazu and his army of approximately 80,000 men in positions atop Amba Aradam. Ras Imru Haile Selassie with approximately 40,000 men was on the Ethiopian left in the area around Seleclaca in Shire Province. Only a minority of the Ethiopian soldiers had received military training, there were few modern weapons and less than one rifle per man.

Badoglio had five army corps at his disposal. On his right, he had the Italian IV Corps and the Italian II Corps facing Ras Imru in the Shire. In the Italian center was the Eritrean Corps facing Ras Kassa and Ras Seyoum in the Tembien. Facing Ras Mulugeta dug into Amba Aradam was the Italian I Corps and III Corps. Italian dictator Benito Mussolini was impatient for an Italian offensive to get under way.

Initially, Badoglio saw the destruction of Ras Mulugeta's army as his first priority. This force would have to be dislodged from its strong positions on Amba Aradam in order for the Italians to continue the advance towards Addis Ababa. But Ras Kassa and Ras Seyoumm were exerting such pressure from the Tembien that Badoglio decided that he would have to deal with them first. If the Ethiopian center was to successfully advance, I Corps and III Corps facing Ras Mulugeta would be cut off from reinforcement and resupply. From 20 January to 24 January, the First Battle of Tembien was fought. This was fiercely fought, with the Ethiopians cutting off the Italian 1st CC.NN. Division "23 Marzo" for several days and Badoglio drawing up contingency plans for withdrawing the entire army. Eventually Italian pressure and the large scale use of mustard gas told and the threat Ras Kassa posed to the I Corps and III Corps was neutralized.

From the 10 to 19 February, Badoglio attacked the army of Ras Mulugeta, dug in on Amba Aradam during the Battle of Enderta. The Italians made good use of their artillery and aerial superiority, and again the heavy use of Mustard gas. Ras Mulugeta was killed and his army collapsed and was destroyed as a fighting force in the ensuing rout. With this completed, Badoglio turned back to the center to complete what he had started with the First Battle of Tembien. He would leave the army of Ras Imru Haile Selassie for another day.

Badoglio now had three times the men fielded by the three remaining Ethiopian armies; extra divisions had arrived in Eritrea and the network of roads he needed to guarantee resupply had been all but completed. Even so, Badoglio stockpiled 48,000 shells and 7 million rounds of ammunition in forward areas before he started the attack.

Badoglio planned to send the III Corps towards Gaela to cut off the main line of withdrawal for Ras Kassa. After establishing itself across the roads running south from the Abbi Addi region, the Eritrean Corps would advance south from the Worsege (Italian: Uarieu) and Ab'aro passes. These moves by the III Corps and the Eritrean Corps would place the armies of Ras Kassa and Ras Seyoum in a trap. It is possible that Ras Kassa anticipated Badoglio's plan. He sent a wireless message to Emperor Haile Selassie requesting permission to withdraw from the Tembien. The request was superfluous, Selassie had already indicated that Ras Kassa should fall back towards Amba Aradam and link up with the remnants of Ras Mulageta's army.

Battle

In accordance with Badoglio's plan, the Eritrean Corps advanced from the mountain passes and the III Corps moved up from the Geba Valley. The Second Battle of the Tembien was fought on terrain which favoured the defence. It was a region of forests, ravines, and torrents where the Italians were unable to deploy artillery properly or use armoured vehicles. However the Ethiopian soldiers of Ras Seyoum failed to take full advantage of the terrain.

The right wing of the Ethiopian armies rested on Uork Amba (the "mountain of gold"). The Ethiopians established a strong point there. Amba Work blocked the road to Abbi Addi on which the Eritrean Corps and the III Corp planned to converge. One-hundred-and-fifty Alpini and Blackshirt commandos were ordered to capture it under cover of darkness. Armed with grenades and knives, the commandos found the Ethiopians on the summit unprepared when they scaled the peak.

Early on the morning of the 27 February, the army of Ras Seyoum was drawn up in battle array in front of Abbi Addi. Heralded by the wail of battle horns and the roll of the war drums (negarait), a large force of Ethiopians left the shelter of the woods covering Debra Ansa to attack the Italians in the open. From 8:00am to 4:00pm, wave after wave of Ethiopians attempted to break through or get around the positions established by the Alpini and the Blackshirts of the Eritrean columns. Armed for the most part with swords and clubs, the attacks were mowed down and turned back by concentrated machine gun fire. As the attacks wavered the Italian commander counterattacked. Ras Seyoum decided that his men could take no more. His army left more than one-thousand dead on the battlefield as it fled.

With his right flank in the air, Ras Seyoum ordered his army to pull back to the Tekezé fords. But, as his men straggled back along the one road open to them, they were bombed repeatedly. The rocky ravine where they were to cross the river turned out to be a bottleneck. The Italian bombers focused on the concentrated solid mass of defeated Ethiopians and soon the area was turned into a charnel house.

Meanwhile, Ras Kassa and his army on Debra Amba had not yet seen action. Ras Kassa now decided to do what the Emperor had indicated and started to withdraw his army towards Amba Aradam. His army in turn was heavily bombed.  

On 29 February, the III Corps and the Eritrean Corps linked up about three miles west of Abbi Addi and the trap was complete. Even so, a large portion of both Ethiopian armies managed to escape Badoglio's dragnet. However, the men who escaped were demoralized and with little or no equipment. By the time Ras Kassa and Ras Seyoum reached Haile Sellassie's headquarters at Quorom two weeks later, they were accompanied by little more than the men of their personal bodyguards.

Aftermath
Writing as a correspondent at Italian Military Headquarters, Herbert L. Matthews of the New York Times, cabled the following to his paper: 

A United Press correspondent wrote: 

Ras Mulugeta was dead. Ras Kassa and Ras Seyoum were beaten. All three armies commanded by these men had been effectively destroyed. Only one of the four main northern armies remained intact. Badoglio now turned his attention towards Ras Imru and his forces in the Shire. Both Ras Kassa and Ras Seyoum were present at Maychew, the final battle of the war.

See also 

 List of Second Italo-Ethiopian War weapons of Ethiopia
 List of Italian military equipment in the Second Italo-Ethiopian War

References
Footnotes

Citations

Bibliography

See also
 Ethiopian Order of Battle Second Italo-Abyssinian War
 Army of the Ethiopian Empire
 Italian Order of Battle Second Italo-Abyssinian War
 Royal Italian Army

1936 in Ethiopia
Conflicts in 1936
Battles of the Second Italo-Ethiopian War
Battles involving Ethiopia
Battles involving Italy
February 1936 events
Dogu'a Tembien
de:Tembienschlacht#Zweite Tembienschlacht